(1→4)-α-D-Glucan 1-α-D-glucosylmutase (malto-oligosyltrehalose synthase, maltodextrin alpha-D-glucosyltransferase) is an enzyme with systematic name (1->4)-alpha-D-glucan 1-alpha-D-glucosylmutase. This enzyme catalyses the following chemical reaction

 4-[(1->4)-alpha-D-glucosyl]n-1-D-glucose  1-alpha-D-[(1->4)-alpha-D-glucosyl]n-1-alpha-D-glucopyranoside

The enzyme from Arthrobacter sp., Sulfolobus acidocaldarius acts on (1->4)-alpha-D-glucans containing three or more (1->4)-alpha-linked D-glucose units.

References

External links 
 

EC 5.4.99